Henry Martyn Field (October 3, 1837, Brighton, Massachusetts – July 11, 1912, Los Angeles, California) was a gynecologist.

Life
Field graduated from Harvard University in 1859 and from the College of Physicians and Surgeons in New York City in 1862; he was professor of materia medica, and therapeutics at Dartmouth College from 1871 to 1887 and of therapeutics from 1887 to 1893.

References

Attribution

External links
"Children of Sarah Elliot Field", The Worcester Family

Dartmouth College faculty
American gynecologists
Harvard University alumni
Columbia University Vagelos College of Physicians and Surgeons alumni
1837 births
1912 deaths